The sixth season of Teenage Mutant Ninja Turtles aired in 1992. In this season, the Technodrome is located at the bottom of the Arctic Ocean. Transport Modules are used to travel between the Technodrome and New York City.

Episodes
 All sixteen sixth-season episodes were directed by Fred Wolf.

References

External links
TV Com

Teenage Mutant Ninja Turtles (1987 TV series) seasons
1992 American television seasons
Television shows set in the Arctic
Halloween fiction